Amy Gartrell (born 1974) is an American artist. Her work is included in the collections of the Whitney Museum of American Art and the Museum of Modern Art, New York.

References

External links
 Official website

1974 births
Living people
21st-century American artists
21st-century American women artists